St. Matthew's Church, or variations such as St. Matthew Church or Saint Matthew's Catholic Church, may refer to:

Australia
 St Matthew's Church, Guildford, Western Australia
 St Matthews Anglican Church, Grovely, Mitchelton, Brisbane, Queensland
 St Matthew's Church, Kensington, South Australia
 St Matthew's Church, Leyburn, Queensland

Canada
 St. Matthew's United Church (Halifax), Nova Scotia
 St. Matthew's Anglican Church (Ottawa), Ontario

Denmark
 St. Matthew's Church, Copenhagen

Germany
 St. Matthew's Church, Hamburg
 St. Matthew, Leipzig (Matthäikirche)

Jersey
St Matthew's Church, Jersey, in Millbrook

Lithuania
St. Matthew Church, Anykščiai

Malta
St Matthew's Chapel (Iż-Żgħir)
Church of St Matthew, Qrendi

Myanmar

 St Matthew's Church, Moulmein (Mawlamyine), Mon State

Namibia

 St. Matthew's Anglican Church (Namibia), in Walvis Bay

New Zealand
 St Matthew's, Auckland 
 St. Matthew's Church, Dunedin
 St Matthews church, Masterton

Poland
 St. Matthew's Church, Łódź

Singapore
 St. Matthew's Church, Singapore

Sweden
 St. Matthew's Church, Stockholm

United Kingdom
 St Matthew's Church, Brixton, London
 St Matthew's Church, Bromborough Pool, Merseyside
 St Matthew's Church, Buckley, Flintshire, Wales
 St Matthew's Church, Burnley, Lancashire
 St Matthew's Church, Cotham, Bristol
 St Matthew Friday Street, a historical church that was demolished in London
 St. Matthew's Church, Harwell, Oxfordshire
 St Matthew's Church, Haslington, Cheshire
 St Matthew's Church, Leyburn, North Yorkshire
 St Matthew's Church, Little Lever, Greater Manchester
 Church of St Matthew and St James, Mossley Hill, Liverpool
 St Matthew's Church, Northampton
 St Matthew's Church, Paisley, Renfrewshire
 St Matthew's Church, Perth, Perth and Kinross
 St Matthew's Church, Preston, Lancashire
 St Matthew's Church, Rastrick, West Yorkshire
 St Matthew's Church, Saltney, Flintshire
 St Matthew's Church, Sheffield, Yorkshire
 St Matthew's Church, Silverhill, Hastings, East Sussex
 St Matthew's Church, Stretton, Cheshire
St Matthew's Church, Walsall, West Midlands
 St Matthew's Church, Westminster, London
 St Matthew's Church, Widcombe, Bath
 St Matthew's Church, Wigan, Greater Manchester
St Matthew's Church, North Quay, Douglas, Isle of Man, one of the Registered Buildings of the Isle of Man

United States

 Saint Matthew's Catholic Church (Mobile, Alabama)
 St. Matthew's Episcopal Church (National City, California) 
 St. Matthew Church (Norwalk, Connecticut)
 St. Matthew's by the Bridge Episcopal Church, Iowa Falls, Iowa
 St. Matthew's Episcopal Church (Houma, Louisiana) 
 St. Matthew's Episcopal Church (Hallowell, Maine) 
 St. Matthew's Church (Seat Pleasant, Maryland)
 St. Matthew's Episcopal Church (Worcester, Massachusetts), NRHP-listed
 Saint Matthew's Parish Complex, St. Louis, Missouri, listed on the National Register of Historic Places (NRHP)
 St. Matthew's Episcopal Church (Queens), in Woodhaven, New York
 St. Matthew Catholic Church (Charlotte, North Carolina)
 St. Matthew's Episcopal Church and Churchyard, Hillsborough, North Carolina 
 St. Matthew's Episcopal Church (Barrington, Rhode Island) 
 St. Matthew's Church (Central Falls, Rhode Island)
 St. Matthew's Church (Champlain, Virginia)
 St. Matthew's Episcopal Church (Kenosha, Wisconsin)
 St. Matthew's Churches, a mail-based ministry run by James Eugene Ewing

See also
St. Matthew's Cathedral (disambiguation)
St. Matthew's Episcopal Church (disambiguation)